Satoru Yoneoka (born September 6, 1985) is a Japanese PTVI Paratriathlete. He competed at the 2020 Summer Paralympics, winning a bronze medal in the men's PTVI Triathlon.

References 

1985 births
Living people
Medalists at the 2020 Summer Paralympics
Paralympic bronze medalists for Japan
Paratriathletes of Japan
Paratriathletes at the 2020 Summer Paralympics
21st-century Japanese people